Hayakawa (written: 早川) is a Japanese surname. Notable people with the surname include:

Chuko Hayakawa (born 1945), Japanese politician
Hiromi Hayakawa (1982–2017), Mexican singer
, Japanese swimmer
Kenichi Hayakawa (born 1986), Japanese male badminton player
Kiyotaka Hayakawa (1946–2005), Japanese handball player
Masato Hayakawa (born 1986), Japanese-American singer
Nami Hayakawa (born 1984), Japanese athlete
Norio Hayakawa (born 1944), American activist
Noritsugu Hayakawa (1881–1942), Japanese businessman
Ren Hayakawa (born 1987), Japanese female archer
S. I. Hayakawa (1906–1992), semanticist and United States Senator from California
Sakura Hayakawa (born 1997), Japanese rhythmic gymnast
Sayo Hayakawa (born 1983), Japanese fashion model
Sessue Hayakawa (1889–1973), motion picture actor
Tokuji Hayakawa (1894–1981), founder of Hayakawa Kinzoku Kougyou (the present-day Sharp Corporation)
Tomonobu Hayakawa (born 1977), former Japanese footballer
Hayakawa Senkichirō (1863–1922), Japanese politician and president of the South Manchurian Railway
Lady Hayakawa (died 1613), one of Hōjō Ujiyasu's daughters, married to Imagawa Ujizane

See also
Hayakawa Award, an award chosen annually by the readers of Hayakawa's SF Magazine
Hayakawa Publishing, a Japanese publisher
Hayakawa Station, a railway station on the Tōkaidō Main Line of East Japan Railway Company in Odawara, Kanagawa Prefecture, Japan
Hayakawa, Yamanashi, a town in Japan
Hayakawa or Haya River, a river in Kanagawa, Japan

Japanese-language surnames